The Finance Act 2008 (c 9) is an Act of the Parliament of the United Kingdom which changes the United Kingdom's tax law as announced in the budget on 12 March 2008 by Chancellor of the Exchequer Alistair Darling. It received royal assent on 21 July 2008, and pursuant to section 1 of the Parliament Act 1911, the Act was not read a third time by the House of Lords.

See also
Finance Act
BN66

References

United Kingdom Acts of Parliament 2008
2008 in economics
Tax legislation in the United Kingdom